Man Kam To or Mankamto (Hong Kong Hakka: Vun2 Gim3 Tu4) is an area in the North District, New Territories, Hong Kong near the border with Shenzhen in mainland China.

Administration
For electoral purposes, Man Kam To is part of the Sha Ta constituency of the North District Council. It is currently represented by Ko Wai-kei, who was elected in the local elections.

Border
The area includes the Man Kam To Control Point, one of the four road checkpoints between Hong Kong and mainland China, as well as the San Uk Ling Holding Centre, operated by the Immigration Department.

Closed Area
Access to Man Kam To is restricted as it is located in the Frontier Closed Area of the New Territories. For those who are not residents within the Closed Area, or are not crossing the border, a Closed Area Permit is required. Applications for a Closed Area Permit can be made online at the Hong Kong Police website. As of 4 January 2016, part of this area is excluded from the identity as a restricted area.

References

External links 

 Download Closed Area Permit application form

North District, Hong Kong
Restricted areas of Hong Kong red public minibus